GI/GU may refer to:
Human gastrointestinal tract
Genitourinary system